The 1998 Grand Prix de Denain was the 40th edition of the Grand Prix de Denain cycle race and was held on 23 April 1998. The race was won by Jaan Kirsipuu.

General classification

References

1998
1998 in road cycling
1998 in French sport